Ardwight Chamberlain (sometimes credited as R.D. Chamberlain or R. Dwight; born February 16, 1957) is an American voice actor and screen writer currently living in Los Angeles, California. He is best known as the voice of Vorlon Ambassador Kosh on the science-fiction television series Babylon 5. He has also written a number of episodes for the animated TV show Digimon: Digital Monsters, has appeared on the game show Jeopardy!, and has written and provided voices for the English dubbed versions of several Japanese anime.

Chamberlain did the voice for both Kosh (a main cast member of the series) and Ulkesh in the Babylon 5 series starting in 1994 until 1997, totaling 20 episodes. Although he has been "the voice" of Kosh, the man underneath the encounter suit was Jeffrey Willerth.

He provides the voice for the character of Nicolai (Nicolas) Conrad in the English language version of the video game Shadow Hearts: Covenant (2004).

Filmography

Voice Roles

Anime
 8 Man After - Chen
 Barefoot Gen - Mr. Pak, Narrator
 Casshan: Robot Hunter - Akubon
 Doomed Megalopolis - Kamo
 Katy Caterpillar - Boss Bee
 Lupin III: Mystery of Mamo - Goemon Ishikawa XIII (Streamline dub)
 Nadia: The Secret of Blue Water - Jean (Streamline dub)
 Robotech II: The Sentinels - Rem
 Swiss Family Robinson - Fritz Robinson
 Unico - Devil, Gods
 Zentrix - Webster

Animation
 Lucky Luke: The Dalton on the Run - Jolly Jumper, Rantanplan, Small Jean

Television
 Babylon 5 - Kosh, Ulkesh, Vorlon

Video Games
 Shadow Hearts: Covenant - Nicolas Conrad

Production Credits

Voice Director
 Aladdin and the Magic Lamp
 Katy Caterpillar
 Robotech: The Movie
 Teknoman

Script Writing
 8 Man After
 Babylon 5
 Barefoot Gen
 Captain Harlock and the Queen of a Thousand Years
 Casshan: Robot Hunter
 Crimson Wolf
 Digimon: Digital Monsters
 Digimon Adventure Tri
 Dirty Pair: Affair of Nolandia
 Dirty Pair: Flight 005 Conspiracy
 Dirty Pair: Project Eden
 DNA Sights 999.9
 Dragon Slayer: The Legend of Heroes
 Dragon Warrior
 Dream-Star Button Nose
 Final Fantasy: Legend of the Crystals
 Glitter Force
 Golgo 13: Queen Bee
 Goku: Midnight Eye
 Grimm Masterpiece Theater
 The Littl' Bits
 Lupin III: The Mystery of Mamo
 Maple Town Stories
 Marvel Anime
 Naruto
 Neo-Tokyo
 Ninja Scroll: The Series
 Noozles
 Ox Tales
 Reign: The Conqueror
 Robotech
 Saban's Adventures of Peter Pan
 Saban's Adventures of Pinocchio
 Sailor Moon SuperS
 Saint Tail
 Samurai Pizza Cats
 The Sea Prince and the Fire Child
 Stitch!
 Tiger & Bunny
 Unico
 Wowser
 Zatch Bell!

References

External links
 
 
 The Great Machine: Babylon 5 Encyclopedia

American male voice actors
Robotech cast and crew
1957 births
Living people
People from San Mateo, California
American television writers
American male television writers
Screenwriters from California